Michael L. Overton is an American computer scientist and mathematician.
He is the Silver Professor of Computer Science and former Chair of the Computer Science department at Courant Institute of Mathematical Sciences, New York University. His research interests are in
Numerical Analysis, Optimization, and Scientific Computing.

Education and career 

Overton received his B.Sc. in Computer Science from the University of British Columbia in 1974 and received his Ph.D. in computer science from Stanford University in 1979, under the supervision of Gene Golub. He joined the Computer Science Department at Courant Institute of Mathematical Sciences, New York University soon after that, and served as its chair. He was the editor-in-chief of the SIAM Journal on Optimization from 1995 to 1999 and is an inaugural SIAM Fellow.

Works 
 Numerical Computing with IEEE Floating Point Arithmetic, SIAM, 2001.

References

External links
 Google Scholar
 Homepage at NYU

American computer scientists
Courant Institute of Mathematical Sciences faculty
Fellows of the Society for Industrial and Applied Mathematics
Living people
Scientific computing researchers
Stanford University alumni
Year of birth missing (living people)